Before Sunrise is a 1989 Soviet action film directed by Yaropolk Lapshin.

Plot 
The film takes place in the summer of 1941. A young lieutenant of the NKVD, together with a group of political prisoners and criminals, comes under fire, as a result of which only three survived.

Cast 
 Valeri Ryzhakov as Kolya
 Aleksandr Pankratov-Chyorny
 Yevgeny Mironov
 Oleg Korchikov
 Konstantin Stepankov as Nevolin
 Vyacheslav Kirilichev as Efim
 Raisa Ryazanova as Lesnichikha
 Igors Varpa
 Viktor Uralskiy
 Igor Golovin as Perevodchik

References

External links 
 

1989 films
1980s Russian-language films
Soviet comedy films
1989 comedy films
Films scored by Eduard Artemyev